Niels Fredrik Dahl (born 11 May 1957) is a Norwegian novelist, poet and dramatist. He was awarded the Brage Prize in 2002 for the novel På vei til en venn. He has also written scripts for TV series. Dahl is married to author and journalist Linn Ullmann.

Awards 
2002 – Brage Prize
2002 – Norwegian Ibsen Award

References

1957 births
Living people
21st-century Norwegian novelists
Norwegian male poets
Norwegian male novelists
21st-century Norwegian male writers